Tavo Hellmund (born February 24, 1966 in Mexico City, Mexico) is an American businessman, event promoter and former racing driver. Although he worked for the 1986 FIFA World Cup in Mexico, Hellmund is better known for his work in Formula One racing, where he was responsible for both the return of the United States Grand Prix (2012, Austin) and the Mexican Grand Prix (2015), in addition to being a founding partner of Circuit of the Americas. As such, he has been described in journalism as the mastermind of the United States Grand Prix, and North America's F1 Hero.

Racing career 
Hellmund won races in FIA Formula Ford and Formula 3, SCCA, Formula Ford, American Sedan, NASCAR Grand National and Late Models, ending his driving career in 2005 due to budget constraints.

Promoter 
Hellmund has worked in several capacities on dozens of events, including a variety of races such as INDYCAR, IMSA and SCCA. Outside of motorsport his work includes the 1986 World Cup. From 2005–2009, he promoted the Texas Racefest which combined a National USAC Midget Race and a NASCAR Grand National race in the same event. Racefest was a sellout and won his company (Full Throttle Productions) Short Track Promoter of the Year in 2006.

United States Grand Prix 
Hellmund has had a lifelong relationship with Bernie Ecclestone. In May 2010, Formula One announced that a 10-year deal was made with Hellmund's Full Throttle Productions for the United States Grand Prix to be hosted at Circuit of the Americas outside of Austin, Texas beginning in 2012.

Hellmund named the track Circuit of the Americas after a horse track in Mexico City owned by his business partners. He originally sketched the layout of the track on a barbecue napkin back in 2007. After a dispute with one of the COTA investors, Hellmund agreed to being bought out in 2014.

Mexican Grand Prix 
In July 2014, Ecclestone confirmed the Mexican Grand Prix would return to the F1 schedule in the 2015 season. Hellmund worked with Alejandro Soberon, chief executive of Grupo CIE, to launch the event. After the first event, John Maher of the Austin American Statesman recounted that, on Sunday November 1, 2015 the Mexican Grand Prix had a race-day attendance of 134,850, and the three-day mark was 335,850. Three-time world champion and former Mercedes chairman Niki Lauda told reporters after the Mexican Grand Prix, "It was the best I've ever seen in my whole life." David Tremayne of The Straits Times wrote, "Now, that's a serious audience. As an object lesson in how to organize a grand prix, Hellmund's team set a new benchmark, and for this, the sport should be grateful". In December 2019 the Mexican Grand Prix was awarded the Formula One Race Promoters' Trophy for a record fifth year in a row.

Manor F1 Team 
In November 2015, it was reported that Hellmund was considering buying the Manor F1 Team, which was struggling financially, from Stephen Fitzpatrick. Hellmund stated that towards the end of 2016, a consortium led by him had agreed to the purchase on the condition that the team finished the season in 10th place in the Constructors' Championship. This would have guaranteed the team $15 million the following year in prize money. However, Manor lost the position at the Brazilian Grand Prix and the deal fell apart. Manor fell into administration and was out of business two months later.

SportsTek SPAC 
On February 17, 2021 Hellmund, along with former Houston Astros general manager Jeff Luhnow and San Antonio Spurs CEO RC Buford announced the pricing of the initial public offering for their special-purpose acquisition company SportsTek listed on the Nasdaq Exchange.

References 

1960 births
Living people
American racing drivers
British Formula Three Championship drivers
American motorsport people
American expatriates in Mexico